Unity is a cross-platform game engine developed by Unity Technologies, first announced and released in June 2005 at Apple Worldwide Developers Conference as a Mac OS X game engine. The engine has since been gradually extended to support a variety of desktop, mobile, console and virtual reality platforms. It is particularly popular for iOS and Android mobile game development, is considered easy to use for beginner developers, and is popular for indie game development.

The engine can be used to create three-dimensional (3D) and two-dimensional (2D) games, as well as interactive simulations and other experiences. The engine has been adopted by industries outside video gaming, such as film, automotive, architecture, engineering, construction, and the United States Armed Forces.

History 
The Unity game engine launched in 2005, aiming to "democratize" game development by making it accessible to more developers. The next year, Unity was named runner-up in the Best Use of Mac OS X Graphics category in Apple Inc.'s Apple Design Awards. Unity was initially released for Mac OS X, later adding support for Microsoft Windows and Web browsers.

Unity 2.0 (2007) 
Unity 2.0 launched in 2007 with approximately 50 new features. The release included an optimized terrain engine for detailed 3D environments, real-time dynamic shadows, directional lights and spotlights, video playback, and other features. The release also added features whereby developers could collaborate more easily. It included a Networking Layer for developers to create multiplayer games based on the User Datagram Protocol, offering Network Address Translation, State Synchronization, and Remote Procedure Calls.

When Apple launched its App Store in 2008, Unity quickly added support for the iPhone. For several years, the engine was uncontested on the iPhone and it became well-known with iOS game developers.

Unity 3.0 (2010) 
Unity 3.0 launched in September 2010 with features expanding the engine's graphics features for desktop computers and video game consoles. In addition to Android support, Unity 3 featured integration of Illuminate Labs' Beast Lightmap tool, deferred rendering, a built-in tree editor, native font rendering, automatic UV mapping, and audio filters, among other things.

In 2012 VentureBeat wrote, "Few companies have contributed as much to the flowing of independently produced games as Unity Technologies. [...] More than 1.3 million developers are using its tools to create gee-whiz graphics in their iOS, Android, console, PC, and web-based games. Unity wants to be the engine for multi-platform games, period." A May 2012 survey by Game Developer magazine indicated Unity as its top game engine for mobile platforms.

Unity 4.0 (2012) 
In November 2012, Unity Technologies delivered Unity 4.0. This version added DirectX 11 and Adobe Flash support, new animation tools called Mecanim, and access to the Linux preview.

Facebook integrated a software development kit for games using the Unity game engine in 2013. This featured tools that allowed tracking advertising campaigns and deep linking, where users were directly linked from social media posts to specific portions within games, and easy in-game-image sharing. In 2016, Facebook developed a new PC gaming platform with Unity. Unity provided support for Facebook's gaming platforms, and Unity developers could more quickly export and publish games to Facebook.

Unity 5 (2015) 
The Verge said of 2015's Unity 5 release: "Unity started with the goal of making game development universally accessible. [...] Unity 5 is a long-awaited step towards that future." With Unity 5, the engine improved its lighting and audio. Through WebGL, Unity developers could add their games to compatible Web browsers with no plug-ins required for players. Unity 5.0 offered real-time global illumination, light mapping previews, Unity Cloud, a new audio system, and the Nvidia PhysX 3.3 physics engine. The fifth generation of the Unity engine also introduced Cinematic Image Effects to help make Unity games look less generic. Unity 5.6 added new lighting and particle effects, updated the engine's overall performance, and added native support for Nintendo Switch, Facebook Gameroom, Google Daydream, and the Vulkan graphics API. It introduced a 4K video player capable of running 360-degree videos for virtual reality.

However, some gamers criticized Unity's accessibility due to the high volume of quickly produced games published on the Steam distribution platform by inexperienced developers. CEO John Riccitiello said in an interview that he believes this to be a side-effect of Unity's success in democratizing game development: "If I had my way, I'd like to see 50 million people using Unity – although I don't think we're going to get there any time soon. I'd like to see high school and college kids using it, people outside the core industry. I think it's sad that most people are consumers of technology and not creators. The world's a better place when people know how to create, not just consume, and that's what we're trying to promote."

Unity (2017–present) 
In December 2016, Unity Technologies announced that they would change the versioning numbering system for Unity from sequence-based identifiers to year of release to align the versioning with their more frequent release cadence; Unity 5.6 was therefore followed by Unity 2017. Unity 2017 tools featured a real-time graphics rendering engine, color grading and worldbuilding, live operations analytics and performance reporting. Unity 2017.2 underscored Unity Technologies' plans beyond video games. This included new tools such as Timeline, which allowed developers to drag-and-drop animations into games, and Cinemachine, a smart camera system within games. Unity 2017.2 also integrated Autodesk's 3DS Max and Maya tools into the Unity engine for a streamlined asset sharing in-game iteration process.

Unity 2018 featured the Scriptable Render Pipeline for developers to create high-end graphics. This included the High-Definition Rendering Pipeline for console and PC experiences, and the Lightweight Rendering Pipeline (later renamed to the Universal Render Pipeline) for mobile, virtual reality, and augmented reality. Unity 2018 also included machine learning tools, such as Imitation Learning, whereby games learn from real player habits, support for Magic Leap, and templates for new developers.

The C# source code of Unity was published under a "reference-only" license in March 2018, which prohibits reuse and modification.

As of 2020, software built with Unity's game engine was running on more than 1.5 billion devices. According to Unity, apps made with their game engine account for 50 percent of all mobile games, and are downloaded more than 3 billion times per month, and approximately 15,000 new projects are started daily with its software. Financial Times reported that Unity's engine "powers some of the world's most lucrative mobile games", such as Pokémon Go and Activision's Call of Duty Mobile.

In June 2020, Unity introduced the Mixed and Augmented Reality Studio (MARS), which provides developers with additional functionality for rules-based generation of augmented reality (AR) applications. Unity released Unity Forma, an automotive and retail solution tool, on December 9, 2020.

Unity acquired Finger Food Advanced Technology Group in 2020, as it aimed to bolster its non-video game uses and offer additional design help to customers. The company went public in September 2020, to further expand use of its game engine into industries outside of gaming.

In June 2020, Unity announced the Unity Editor will support Apple Silicon. The first beta version shipped later that year.

Unity 2021 brought multiple new features such as Bolt, Unity's Visual Scripting system, a new multiplayer library to support multiplayer games, improved Il2cpp runtime performance, Volumetric clouds for the High Definition Render pipeline. Shadow caching and Screen Space Global Illumination for HDRP. For the Universal Render Pipeline it added new features such as point light shadows, Deferred renderer and general core engine improvements and fixes. Full Apple Silicon support was also added in Unity 2021.2. Unity Hub support for Apple Silicon editors arrived in version 3.0 in January 2022.

For the year 2022, Unity has come up with some upgrades which involves speed integration to enter play mode and import files, visual search queries and multiselection in the package manager. For 2D creators, they've focused on accelerating foundations, import, animation, and physics. They have added Sprite Atlas v2, support for PSD extension files and layer management in the 2D PSD Importer, and Delaunay tessellation for 2D physics.

Overview 
Unity gives users the ability to create games and experiences in both 2D and 3D, and the engine offers a primary scripting API in C# using Mono, for both the Unity editor in the form of plugins, and games themselves, as well as drag and drop functionality. Prior to C# being the primary programming language used for the engine, it previously supported Boo, which was removed with the release of Unity 5, and a Boo-based implementation of JavaScript called UnityScript, which was deprecated in August 2017, after the release of Unity 2017.1, in favor of C#.

Within 2D games, Unity allows importation of sprites and an advanced 2D world renderer. For 3D games, Unity allows specification of texture compression, mipmaps, and resolution settings for each platform that the game engine supports, and provides support for bump mapping, reflection mapping, parallax mapping, screen space ambient occlusion (SSAO), dynamic shadows using shadow maps, render-to-texture and full-screen post-processing effects.

Two separate render pipelines are available, High Definition Render Pipeline (HDRP) and Universal Render Pipeline (URP, previously LWRP), in addition to the legacy built-in pipeline. All three render pipelines are incompatible with each other. Unity offers a tool to upgrade shaders using the legacy renderer to URP or HDRP.

Supported platforms 
Unity is a cross-platform engine. The Unity editor is supported on Windows, macOS, and the Linux platform, while the engine itself currently supports building games for more than 19 different platforms, including mobile, desktop, consoles, and virtual reality. Unity 2020 LTS officially supports the following platforms:
 Mobile platforms iOS, Android (Android TV), tvOS;
 Desktop platforms Windows (Universal Windows Platform), Mac, Linux;
 Web platform WebGL;
 Console platforms PlayStation (PS4, PS5), Xbox (Xbox One, Xbox Series X/S), Nintendo Switch, Stadia;
 Virtual/Extended reality platforms Oculus, PlayStation VR, Google's ARCore, Apple's ARKit, Windows Mixed Reality (HoloLens), Magic Leap, and via Unity XR SDK Steam VR, Google Cardboard.

Formerly supported platforms are Wii, Wii U, PlayStation 3, Xbox 360, Tizen, PlayStation Vita, 3DS, BlackBerry 10, Windows Phone 8, Samsung Smart TV, Gear VR, Daydream, Vuforia, and Facebook Gameroom. Unity formerly supported other platforms including its own Unity Web Player, a Web browser plugin. However, it was deprecated in favor of WebGL. Since version 5, Unity has been offering its WebGL bundle compiled to JavaScript using a 2-stage language translator (C# to C++ and finally to JavaScript).

Unity was the default software development kit (SDK) used for Nintendo's Wii U video game console, with a free copy included by Nintendo with each Wii U developer license. Unity Technologies called this bundling of a third-party SDK an "industry first".

Licensing model 
During its first ten years as a product, the paid versions of Unity were sold outright; in 2016, the corporation changed to a subscription model. Unity has free and paid licensing options. The free license is for personal use or smaller companies generating less than $100,000 annually, later raised to $200,000, and the subscriptions are based on revenues generated by the games using Unity. The paid option, Unity Pro, had been required for developers that had over $200,000 in annual revenue, but this also could have been provided for console developers through a Preferred Platform License from the console manufacturer. The Unity Pro keys would have been part of the other SDK from the console manufacturer that the developer paid for. In June 2021, Unity changed this plan slightly to require any developer making games on the closed console systems (PlayStation, Nintendo Switch, and Xbox) regardless of revenue to have a Unity Pro license or a Preferred Platform License Key from the manufacturers. Sony and Nintendo provide this as part of the SDK, but Microsoft had yet to implement this functionality for their SDK. The engine source code is licensed on a "per-case basis via special arrangements".

Unity Asset Store 
Creators can develop and sell user-generated assets to other game makers via the Unity Asset Store. This includes 3D and 2D assets and environments for developers to buy and sell. Unity Asset Store launched in 2010. By 2018, there had been approximately 40 million downloads through the digital store.

Usage

Video games 
The engine is used in games including Pokémon Go, Monument Valley, Call of Duty: Mobile, Beat Saber and Cuphead according to the Financial Times.

, Unity had been used to create approximately half of the mobile games on the market and 60 percent of augmented reality and virtual reality content, including approximately 90 percent on emerging augmented reality platforms, such as Microsoft HoloLens, and 90 percent of Samsung Gear VR content. Unity technology is the basis for most virtual reality and augmented reality experiences, and Fortune said Unity "dominates the virtual reality business". Unity Machine Learning Agents is open-source software whereby the Unity platform connects to machine learning programs, including Google's TensorFlow. Using trial and error in Unity Machine Learning Agents, virtual characters use reinforcement learning to build creative strategies in lifelike virtual landscapes. The software is used to develop robots and self-driving cars.

Non-gaming industries uses 
In the 2010s, Unity Technologies used its game engine to transition into other industries using the real-time 3D platform, including film and automotive. Unity first experimented in filmmaking with Adam, a short film about a robot escaping from prison. Later, Unity partnered with filmmaker Neill Blomkamp, whose Oats Studios used the engine's tools, including real-time rendering and Cinemachine, to create two computer-generated short films, Adam: The Mirror and Adam: The Prophet. At the 2017 Unite Europe conference in Amsterdam, Unity focused on filmmaking with Unity 2017.1's new Cinemachine tool. In 2018, Disney Television Animation launched three shorts, called Baymax Dreams, that were created using the Unity engine. The Unity engine was also used by Disney to create backgrounds for the 2019 film The Lion King.

Automakers use Unity's technology to create full-scale models of new vehicles in virtual reality, build virtual assembly lines, and train workers. Unity's engine is used by DeepMind, an Alphabet Inc. company, to train artificial intelligence. Other uses being pursued by Unity Technologies include architecture, engineering, and construction.

Unity Technologies Japan mascot 
On December 16, 2013, Unity Technologies Japan revealed an official mascot character named , real name  (voiced by ). The character's associated game data was released in early 2014. The character was designed by Unity Technologies Japan designer "ntny" as an open-source heroine character. The company allows the use of Unity-chan and related characters in secondary projects under certain licenses. For example, Unity-chan appears as a playable character in Runbow.

See also 

 List of game engines
 List of WebGL frameworks

References

External links 

 

.NET game engines
2005 software
Game engines for Linux
Game engines that support Vulkan (API)
IPhone video game engines
MacOS programming tools
Mono project applications
Video game engines
Video game IDE